Mount Everest Nepal was a Palauan association football club which competed in the Palau Soccer League, the top level league in Palau, for the first time in the inaugural season in 2004, when they were runners up, losing 2–0 to Daewoo Ngatpang in the final. It is also known that they competed in the 2006–07 where they finished third, beating Palau Tiger Team 4–2 in the third place play-off. Due to fragmentary records, it is not known how many other seasons they competed, particularly between 2004 and 2006.

Players

2004 Squad

References

Football clubs in Palau